The 2007 NCAA Skiing Championships were contested at the Wildcat Mountain Ski Area in Jackson, New Hampshire as part of the 54th annual NCAA-sanctioned ski tournament to determine the individual and team national champions of men's and women's collegiate slalom and cross-country skiing in the United States.

Dartmouth, coached by Cami Thompson, won the team championship, the Big Green's first co-ed title and first overall title.

Venue

This year's NCAA skiing championships were hosted by the Wildcat Mountain Ski Area near Jackson, New Hampshire.

Program

Men's events
 Cross country, 10 kilometer freestyle
 Cross country, 20 kilometer classical
 Slalom
 Giant slalom

Women's events
 Cross country, 5 kilometer freestyle
 Cross country, 15 kilometer classical
 Slalom
 Giant slalom

Team scoring

 DC – Defending champions
 Debut team appearance

See also
 List of NCAA skiing programs

References

2007 in sports in New Hampshire
NCAA Skiing Championships
2007 in alpine skiing
2007 in cross-country skiing
NCAA Skiing Championships
College sports in New Hampshire
Skiing in New Hampshire